John Albert (born January 19, 1989) is an American professional ice hockey forward who is currently the captain for the Toledo Walleye in the ECHL. He was selected by the Atlanta Thrashers in the 6th round (175th overall) of the 2007 NHL Entry Draft and has formerly played with the Winnipeg Jets. Albert was born in Cleveland, Ohio, but grew up in Concord Township, Ohio.

Playing career
Prior to turning professional, Albert played NCAA college hockey with Ohio State University.

On July 20, 2011, Albert signed with the St. John's IceCaps of the American Hockey League (AHL) for the 2011–12 AHL season.  On December 2, 2013, one day after being recalled by the Winnipeg Jets, Albert scored his first NHL goal on his first shot on goal in the league, beating goalie Cam Talbot of the New York Rangers in Winnipeg's 5–2 victory at Madison Square Gardens.

On June 29, 2015, the Jets gave Albert a qualifying offer in order to retain his negotiation rights.  Albert later signed an AHL contract with the Jets' new affiliate, the Manitoba Moose, on September 16, 2015. After attending the Jets training camp on a try-out, he joined the Manitoba Moose and was named team captain.

On July 3, 2016, Albert ended his long tenure within the Thrashers/Jets organization, joining Oulun Kärpät of the Finnish Liiga. In the 2016–17 season, Albert made a seamless transition to European hockey and contributed with 12 goals and 24 points in 42 games for Kärpät.

On July 3, 2017, after a year's absence, Albert returned to the NHL in securing a one-year, two-way contract with the Washington Capitals. During the 2017–18 season, on February 9, 2018, the Capitals traded Albert to the New York Rangers organization. He was directly assigned to the Rangers AHL affiliate, the Hartford Wolf Pack, for the remainder of the season.

As a free agent from the Rangers, Albert returned to Europe in agreeing to a one-year deal with German club, Grizzlys Wolfsburg, of the Deutsche Eishockey Liga on July 3, 2018. During preparation with the Grizzlys for the 2018–19 campaign, Albert suffered a long-term injury, forcing him out for the entirety of the season.

Returning to North America, Albert resumed his professional career in the 2019–20 season after signing a contract with the Jacksonville Icemen of the ECHL, a secondary affiliate to the Winnipeg Jets, on October 3, 2019. In the 2019–20 season, Albert collected 29 points through 44 regular season games before the season was cancelled due to the COVID-19 pandemic.

As a free agent into the pandemic delayed 2020–21 season, Albert belatedly joined the Wichita Thunder of the ECHL on January 22, 2021. He split the season between the Thunder and the Rapid City Rush, finishing with a combined 11 points in 30 games.

Albert continued his career in the ECHL, agreeing to return for a fourth season in the league in joining the Toledo Walleye as a free agent on September 29, 2021.

Career statistics

Regular season and playoffs

International

References

External links
 

1989 births
Living people
American men's ice hockey centers
Atlanta Thrashers draft picks
Hartford Wolf Pack players
Hershey Bears players
Ice hockey people from Cleveland
Jacksonville Icemen players
Manitoba Moose players
Ohio State Buckeyes men's ice hockey players
Oulun Kärpät players
People from Lake County, Ohio
Rapid City Rush players
St. John's IceCaps players
Toledo Walleye players
USA Hockey National Team Development Program players
Wichita Thunder players
Winnipeg Jets players